Petroleum exploitation companies operate a fleet of Ice Breaking Emergency Evacuation Vessels (IBEEV) on the Caspian Sea, to service the extensive oil fields there.
The vessels are designed to evacuate up to 338 individuals per trip. They are designed to function using compressed air to power their engines, if they are passing through pools of burning oil, or oxygen poor environments—carrying enough compressed air to function for 50 minutes. Every evacuee is issued a rebreather, for passing through anoxic environments, if the airtight evacuation capsules are compromised. The vessels are insulated so passengers and crew can survive transiting through pools of burning oil.

The vessels were designed by AKAC Inc. and Robert Allan Limited, a firm of Canadian naval architects.
Initially, in 2005 Remontowa built four vessels. 
By 2012 the fleet contained ten vessels.

There is provision to carry ten stretcher-bound, wounded evacuees, while the remaining 328 evacuees are seated in one of three evacuation capsules.
Only two crewmembers are required to operate the vessels.

References

Icebreakers